The Rural Municipality of Chaplin No. 164 is a rural municipality (RM) in the Canadian province of Saskatchewan within Census Division No. 7 and  Division No. 2. It is located in the southwest portion of the province.

History 
The RM of Chaplin No. 164 incorporated as a rural municipality on January 1, 1913.

Geography 
Chaplin Lake, a large saline lake, is located in the RM.

Communities and localities 
Chaplin
Droxford
Halvorgate
Melaval
Val Jean

Demographics 

Economy 
The production of sodium sulphate is a major industry combined with grain and livestock agriculture.

Government 
The RM of Chaplin No. 164 is governed by an elected municipal council and an appointed administrator that meets on the second Tuesday of every month. The reeve of the RM is Duane Doell while its administrator is Faye Campbell. The RM's office is located in Chaplin.

References 

C
Main
Division No. 7, Saskatchewan